Vatroslav Mihačić (born 30 September 1967) is a retired Croatian football player. He played as goalkeeper for Hajduk Split, Neretva and NK Zagreb in Croatia, and had a four-year spell at Portuguese side Gil Vicente.

Playing career
He played for Hajduk in the 1990–91 Yugoslav First League, the last season before Croatian clubs decided to leave the league to form 1. HNL, and in the 1991 Yugoslav Cup Final in which Hajduk beat the reigning champions of Europe Red Star Belgrade 1–0 to lift the trophy, alongside club stars such as Igor Štimac, Slaven Bilić, Alen Bokšić and Robert Jarni.

With Hajduk he went on to win two Croatian league titles (1992 and 1994) and the 1993 Croatian Cup. After spending the 1994–95 season at NK Neretva he moved to Gil Vicente in Portugal, with whom he won the Liga de Honra in 1999. That same year he returned to Croatia and spent two seasons playing for NK Zagreb before retiring in 2001.

Managerial career
After retiring from football he worked as goalkeepers coach in coaching staff with three Croatia national football team managers: Otto Barić in 2004, Zlatko Kranjčar in 2006 and Niko Kovač in 2013.

He is director of the Croatian Football Federation coaching academy.

Honours
 1 × Yugoslav Cup: 1991
 2 × Croatian First League: 1992, 1994
 1 × Croatian Cup: 1993
 1 × Croatian Super Cup: 1993
 1 × Portuguese Second Division: 1999

References

External links

  article in SD (season 1985/86)
  article in SD (season 1988/89)
  article in SD (season 1989/90)

1967 births
Living people
Footballers from Zagreb
Association football goalkeepers
Yugoslav footballers
Croatian footballers
NK Junak Sinj players
NK Primorac 1929 players
HNK Hajduk Split players
NK Neretva players
Gil Vicente F.C. players
NK Zagreb players
Yugoslav First League players
Croatian Football League players
Primeira Liga players
Liga Portugal 2 players
Croatian expatriate footballers
Expatriate footballers in Portugal
Croatian expatriate sportspeople in Portugal
Association football goalkeeping coaches
AS Monaco FC non-playing staff